Geir Finne (10 May 1948 – 21 October 2020) was a Norwegian politician for the Centre Party.

He was born in Bergen and grew up in Kolvereid. Following education in Germany and the US he spent his professional career at the University of Tromsø. He wrote several books for the general market, including The Svalbard Passage (1981, with Tom Kirkwood) and Heroisk forræderi - den tyske militære motstandsbevegelsen mellom de allierte og Hitler (2019).

Finne was a member of Tromsø city council and served as a deputy representative to the Parliament of Norway from Troms during the term 1993–1997. On 1 February 1996 he resigned from the Centre Party and continued as an independent. In total he met during 3 days of parliamentary session. He later enrolled in the Coastal Party.

He died in Germany at the age of 72.

References

1948 births
2020 deaths
People from Nærøy
People from Tromsø
Academic staff of the University of Tromsø
Deputy members of the Storting
Centre Party (Norway) politicians
Coastal Party politicians
Troms politicians
Norwegian non-fiction writers